On May 8, 1822, William Lowndes (DR) of  resigned.  A special election was held to fill the resulting vacancy

Election results

Hamilton took his seat on January 6, 1823

See also
List of special elections to the United States House of Representatives

References

South Carolina 1822 02
South Carolina 1822 02
1822 02
South Carolina 02
United States House of Representatives 02
United States House of Representatives 1822 02